Jazz with a Twist is an album by American jazz trombonist, composer and arranger Slide Hampton which was released on the Atlantic label in 1962.

Reception

Allmusic gave the album 3 stars.

Track listing 
All compositions by Slide Hampton, except as indicated.
 "The Jazz Twist" - 2:33
 "Mack the Knife" (Kurt Weill, Bertolt Brecht) - 3:00
 "Gorgeous George" - 2:08
 "Strollin'" (Horace Silver) - 3:57
 "The Barbarians" - 6:39
 "Work Song" (Nat Adderley) - 2:55
 "Slide Slid" - 2:52
 "Day In, Day Out" (Rube Bloom, Johnny Mercer) - 4:37
 "Red Top" (Ben Kynard, Lionel Hampton) - 6:20

Personnel 
Slide Hampton - trombone, arranger
Hobart Dotson, Willie Thomas - trumpet
Benny Jacobs-El - trombone
George Coleman - tenor saxophone
Jay Cameron - baritone saxophone
Horace Parlan - piano
Eddie Khan - bass
Vinnie Ruggiero - drums
Ray Barretto - percussion

References 

Slide Hampton albums
1962 albums
Atlantic Records albums
Albums produced by Nesuhi Ertegun